Events in the year 1886 in Germany.

Incumbents

National level
 Kaiser – William I
 Chancellor – Otto von Bismarck

State level

Kingdoms
 King of Bavaria – Ludwig II of Bavaria to 13 June, then Otto of Bavaria
 King of Prussia – Kaiser William I
 King of Saxony – Albert of Saxony
 King of Württemberg – Charles I of Württemberg

Grand Duchies
 Grand Duke of Baden – Frederick I
 Grand Duke of Hesse – Louis IV
 Grand Duke of Mecklenburg-Schwerin – Frederick Francis II
 Grand Duke of Mecklenburg-Strelitz – Frederick William
 Grand Duke of Oldenburg – Peter II
 Grand Duke of Saxe-Weimar-Eisenach – Charles Alexander

Principalities
 Schaumburg-Lippe – Adolf I, Prince of Schaumburg-Lippe
 Schwarzburg-Rudolstadt – George Albert, Prince of Schwarzburg-Rudolstadt
 Schwarzburg-Sondershausen – Charles Gonthier, Prince of Schwarzburg-Sondershausen
 Principality of Lippe – Woldemar, Prince of Lippe
 Reuss Elder Line – Heinrich XXII, Prince Reuss of Greiz
 Reuss Younger Line – Heinrich XIV, Prince Reuss Younger Line
 Waldeck and Pyrmont – George Victor, Prince of Waldeck and Pyrmont

Duchies
 Duke of Anhalt – Frederick I, Duke of Anhalt
 Duke of Brunswick – Prince Albert of Prussia (regent)
 Duke of Saxe-Altenburg – Ernst I, Duke of Saxe-Altenburg
 Duke of Saxe-Coburg and Gotha – Ernst II, Duke of Saxe-Coburg and Gotha
 Duke of Saxe-Meiningen – Georg II, Duke of Saxe-Meiningen

Colonial Governors
 Cameroon (Kamerun) – Julius Freiherr von Soden (1st term)
 German East Africa (Deutsch-Ostafrika) – Karl Peters (administrator)
 German New Guinea (Deutsch-Neuguinea) – Gustav von Oertzen (commissioner); also from 10 June Georg Freiherr von Schleinitz (Landeshauptleute of the German New Guinea Company)
 German South-West Africa (Deutsch-Südwestafrika) – Heinrich Ernst Göring (acting commissioner)
 Togoland – Ernst Falkenthal (commissioner)
 Wituland (Deutsch-Witu) – Gustav Denhardt (resident)

Events
 6 February – German chemist Clemens Winkler discovers chemical element Germanium.
 14 November – Friedrich Soennecken files his patent for his holepunch Papierlocher für Sammelmappen.
 15 November – Robert Bosch GmbH is founded.

Undated
 German Friedrich Soennecken invents the ring binder in Bonn.
 Neuschwanstein Castle is completed.

Births

 Undated – Otto Wunderlich, German landscape photographer (died in 1975)
 2 January – Carl-Heinrich von Stülpnagel German general (died 1944)
 25 January – Wilhelm Furtwängler, German conductor and composer (died 1954)
 14 February – Karl Reinhardt, German philologist (died 1958)
 6 March – Fritz Goerdeler, German jurist (died 1945)
 10 March – Eugen Klöpfer, German actor (died 1950)
 18 March – Lothar von Arnauld de la Perière, German Imperial Naval submarine captain in World War I and Kriegsmarine Rear admiral (died 1941)
 27 March – Ludwig Mies van der Rohe, German architect (died 1969)
 16 April – Ernst Thälmann, German politician (died 1944)
 1 May – Walter Cramer, German businessman (died 1944)
 2 May – Gottfried Benn, German poet and essayist (died 1956)
 3 May – Kurt von Briesen, German general (died 1941)
 5 June – Kurt Hahn, German educator (died 1974)
 7 August – Paul Westheim, German art historian and publisher (died 1963)
 15 August – Karl Korsch, German politician (died 1961)
 19 August – Robert Heger, German conductor (died 1878)
 20 August – Paul Tillich, Christian existentialist philosopher and Lutheran Protestant theologian (died 1965)
 25 August – Johannes Stroux, German philologist and writer (died 1954)
 14 September – Erich Hoepner, German general (died 1944)
 20 September – Duchess Cecilie of Mecklenburg-Schwerin, German crown princess (died 1954)
 4 October – Erich Fellgiebel, German general (died 1944)
 7 October – Kurt Schmitt, German economic leader and the Reich Economy Minister (died 1950)
 15 October – Rudolf von Marogna-Redwitz, German colonel (died 1944)
 26 October – Hanns Braun, German athlete (died 2018)
 6 November – Gus Kahn, German-American songwriter (died 1941)
 7 November – Reinhold Schünzel, German actor (died 1954)
 28 November – Cornelius van Oyen, German sport shooter (died 1954)
 25 December:
 Gotthard Heinrici, German general (died 1971)
 Franz Rosenzweig, German theologian and philosopher (died 1929)

Deaths 

 9 April – Joseph Victor von Scheffel, German poet and novelist (born 1826)
 23 May – Leopold von Ranke, German historian (born 1795)
 13 June – Ludwig II, King of Bavaria (born 1845)
 31 July – Franz Liszt, Alleged Symphonic Lich)

References

Bibliography

 
Years of the 19th century in Germany
Germany
Germany